Ululani was a Hawaiian chiefess, 7th Aliʻi Nui (ruler) of Hilo. She is also known as Ululani Nui ("Ululani the Great") and was the most celebrated woman poet of her day.

Biography
She was a daughter and successor of the chief Mokulani and the chiefess Pāpaʻikaniau, otherwise known as Niau, the daughter of Kuʻimeheua and Kalanikūʻēʻiwalono.

Her name can mean "heavenly inspiration and growth", "raised to prominence" and it can mean "a royal assemblage or collection".

She was married to Keawemaʻuhili and she bore him two sons: Keaweokahikona and ʻElelule Laʻakeaʻelelule. She was also married to Keawe-a-Heulu, and their children were orator Nāʻihe and chiefess Keohohiwa, mother of ʻAikanaka.

Family tree

References

1730s births
Royalty of Hawaii (island)
Year of death missing